Guwahati Stock Exchange (GSE) is a defunct stock exchange located in Gauhati, Assam.

It was incorporated on 29 November 1983 and it was recognised by the Government of India on 1 May 1984 and was permitted to be closed by market regulator SEBI in January 2015.

By 1999–2000, the exchange had a total of 206 brokers, out of which 5 were corporate brokers. Among 206 brokers, there were 200 proprietor brokers, 1 partnership broker and 5 corporate brokers; only 4 sub-brokers registered. At the time of exit, the GSE had 290 listed companies.

The GSE was inter-connected with the National Stock Exchange of India (NSE) through the ISE Securities and Services Ltd. (ISS). ISS is the subsidiary of Inter-connected Stock Exchange of India Ltd. and GSE is one of the associated exchange of it. The trading of GSE is done through screen-based trading system.

See also 
 List of South Asian stock exchanges
 List of stock exchanges in the Commonwealth of Nations

References

Economy of Assam
Economy of Guwahati
Former stock exchanges in India
1983 establishments in Assam
Indian companies established in 1983
Financial services companies established in 1983